Paul Gordon Lauren is an American historian and Regents Professor Emeritus of History at the University of Montana.

Books
 Diplomats and Bureaucrats.  Stanford, CA: Hoover Institution Press, 1976.
 Diplomacy: New Approaches in History, Theory, and Policy.  New York: Free Press, 1979.
 The China Hands Legacy: Ethics and Diplomacy.  Boulder: Westview Press, 1987.
 Power and Prejudice: The Politics and Diplomacy of Racial Discrimination.  Boulder: Westview Press, 1988.  2nd Ed., HarperCollins, 1996.
 Destinies Shared.  Boulder: Westview Press, 1989.
 The Evolution of International Human Rights: Visions Seen.  Philadelphia: University of Pennsylvania Press, 1998.  3rd Ed., 2011.
 Force and Statecraft: Diplomatic Challenges of Our Time. 5th Ed.  (with Gordon A. Craig and Alexander George) New York: Oxford University Press, 2014.

References 

American historians
University of Montana faculty
Living people
Year of birth missing (living people)